Taxi are a Romanian pop-rock band. Their sound is a mix of rock and contemporary pop, occasionally introducing other influences such as Nashville-style guitar licks.

The band was founded on 13 March 1999 in Bucharest. Dan Teodorescu, songwriter, lead vocalist and the band's leader, first recruited Adrian Bortun, with whom he had previously played in Altceva ("Something Else"). Bortun recruited his former bandmate Andrei Bărbulescu from Sarmalele Reci ("The Cold Sarmale"; sarmale are meat rolls with cabbage). Dan also recruited Georgică Pătrănoiu with whom he had also played before.

The band represented Romania at the Eurovision Song Contest 2000 with the song The Moon, finishing 17th.

Band members
Dan Teodorescu (vocals, guitar)
Adrian Bortun (bass guitar)- until November 2009
Cantemir Neacșu (lead guitars), January 2006 – present
George (a.k.a. Georgică or GXG) Pătrănoiu (lead guitars) December 1999-January 2006
Andrei Bărbulescu (drums), March–November 1999, February 2003-June 2006 (?)
Lucian Cioargă (drums), December 1999-February 2003
Darius Neagu (drums), July 2006 – present
Mugurel Coman (keyboards), January 2006 – present
Vicky Albu (vocals) 
Kerezsi Csongor (bass guitar) - November 2009 – present

Albums
Jumătate de album (November 1999)
Trag un claxon (July 2000: Jumătate de album plus seven more songs)
Comunitaru'  (2001)
Americanofonia (summer 2001)
De cursă lungă (2002)
C (June 2003)
Politica (2004)
Romantica (2007)
Cele 2 cuvinte (2011)
15 (2014)
20 (2019)

Notes

External links
 Official Website - includes extensive free downloads of the band's songs, including at least six in English.
 TAXI - Concert, Bucuresti | theFest.ro

Eurovision Song Contest entrants for Romania
Eurovision Song Contest entrants of 2000
Romanian pop music groups
Musical groups established in 1999
1999 establishments in Romania